Pelican Cove is a hamlet in the Canadian province of Saskatchewan.

Demographics 

References

Designated places in Saskatchewan
Leask No. 464, Saskatchewan
Organized hamlets in Saskatchewan
Division No. 16, Saskatchewan